Carbon Cliff is a village in Rock Island County, Illinois, United States. The population was 2,134 at the 2010 census.  It lies in the south part of Hampton Township.

Geography
Carbon Cliff is located at  (41.498698, -90.396129).

Demographics
As of the census of 2000, there were 1,689 people, 683 households, and 454 families residing in the village. The racial makeup of the village was 90.70% White, 4.50% African American, 0.47% Native American, 0.47% Asian, 1.18% from other races, and 2.66% from two or more races. Hispanic or Latino of any race were 5.80% of the population.

There were 683 households, out of which 32.7% had children under the age of 18 living with them, 48.6% were married couples living together, 12.7% had a female householder with no husband present, and 33.5% were non-families. 26.1% of all households were made up of individuals, and 7.8% had someone living alone who was 65 years of age or older. The average household size was 2.43 and the average family size was 2.92.

In the village, the population was spread out, with 26.6% under the age of 18, 10.5% from 18 to 24, 29.1% from 25 to 44, 23.1% from 45 to 64, and 10.8% who were 65 years of age or older. The median age was 35 years. For every 100 females, there were 95.3 males. For every 100 females age 18 and over, there were 91.1 males.

The median income for a household in the village was $35,921, and the median income for a family was $41,429. Males had a median income of $33,750 versus $22,083 for females. The per capita income for the village was $16,998. About 10.2% of families and 12.0% of the population were below the poverty line, including 16.3% of those under age 18 and 0.6% of those age 65 or over.

History
The Chicago and Rock Island railroad (later the Chicago, Rock Island & Pacific) reached Carbon Cliff in 1854.  By the mid-19th century, Carbon Cliff had become a coal mining center, and was named for the many coal mines that dotted the bluff west of town.  The Carbon Cliff mines were the earliest worked on the west side of the Rock River. Stoehr & Schadt Coal Co and others mined extensively for many years, but by the beginning of the 20th century the limited supply of coal was nearly exhausted and mining there was discontinued.

On November 13, 1906 voters of Hampton territory petitioned the county court for permission to incorporate as a village. The citizens voted and with 55 to 28 in favor, Carbon Cliff was incorporated on December 8, 1906.

The Carbon Cliff bluffs were also known as an excellent source of clay.  The Argillo Works was formed in 1865 to produce fire brick and farm-drain tile.  Argillo's products were sold throughout the country and was one of the leading industries of Rock Island County.  In the 1930s, fire destroyed the plant's offices and buildings and the firm went out of business.

From Economical Geology of Illinois, a geological survey by Illinois State Geologist A. H. Worthen, published 1882:

Notable person

 Jude Cole, singer-songwriter, record producer and manager

References

Villages in Rock Island County, Illinois
Villages in Illinois
Cities in the Quad Cities
Populated places established in 1906
1906 establishments in Illinois